Hôtel du Nord is a studio album by American violinist Mark Feldman and pianist Sylvie Courvoisier together with drummer Gerry Hemingway and bassist Thomas Morgan. The album was released on the Intakt Records label in 2011. This is the follow-up album for their 2010 To Fly to Steal recorded by the same line-up.

Reception
John Fordham of The Guardian wrote "his album follows up last year's To Fly to Steal, on which Swiss pianist Courvoisier and her former Nashville violinist husband, Feldman, explored a delicate soundworld between free improv and contemporary classical music with the American bass-and-drums pairing of Thomas Morgan and Gerry Hemingway. It was a testament to the empathy of the two leaders, but this compelling session shows how far their new partnership with Morgan and Hemingway (a former Anthony Braxton percussionist) has come. It's full of an ethereal, non‑referential lyricism of the players' own – an affirmation of the power of pattern and audibly evolving relationships, even if very little of it resembles songs – save for Feldman's occasional offhand jazz quotes, like Goodbye Pork Pie Hat which is slipped into a drifting abstract passage."

Glenn Astarita of JazzReview stated "Adventurous expressionism is a key factor within semi-structured or avant jazz-based endeavors. With their second quartet outing for Intakt Records, pianist Sylvie Courvoisier and violinist Mark Feldman cover a gamut of articulately designed modes of interaction. Introspective, sublime and occasionally foreboding, the quartet engineers a potpourri of delicacies, all executed with a deterministic modality."

Track listing

Personnel
Mark Feldman – violin
Sylvie Courvoisier – piano 
Thomas Morgan – bass
Gerry Hemingway – drums

References 

Mark Feldman albums
Sylvie Courvoisier albums
2011 albums